Dawid Kucharski (born 19 November 1984) is a Polish professional footballer who plays as a defender for Zamek Gołańcz.

Career

Early career in Poland
Born in Kostrzyn nad Odrą, Kucharski began his playing career at Celulozy Kostrzyn. Before the 2002–03 season, he moved to Amica Wronki, where he debuted in the Ekstraklasa for Szczakowianka Jaworzno on 5 October 2002. He joined Lech Poznań at the beginning of the 2006–07 season. He has played in 97 matches in the Polish Ekstraklasa as well as scoring three goals. He helped Lech Poznań to third place in the 2008–09 Ekstraklasa and the 2009 Polish Cup final but missed out on the 1–0 victory over Ruch Chorzów due to injury.

Moving abroad to Hearts
Kucharski signed for Scottish Premier League side Hearts on 5 July 2009. He made his debut on the opening day of the season in a 2–0 defeat to Dundee United at Tannadice. He made a total of 15 appearances during his first season for the club. Kucharski did not feature at all for Hearts during the 2010–11 season and on 26 May 2011 it was announced that he would not be offered a new contract at Tynecastle and was free to find a new club.

Pogoń Szczecin
In June 2011, he joined Pogoń Szczecin on a one-year contract.

International career
Kucharski used to be the captain of the Poland U21 national team.

References

External links
 
 

1984 births
Living people
People from Kostrzyn nad Odrą
Polish footballers
Poland under-21 international footballers
Association football defenders
Lech Poznań players
Amica Wronki players
Heart of Midlothian F.C. players
Pogoń Szczecin players
Ekstraklasa players
I liga players
III liga players
Scottish Premier League players
Polish expatriate footballers
Polish expatriate sportspeople in Scotland
Expatriate footballers in Scotland
Polish expatriate sportspeople in Germany
Expatriate footballers in Germany
Sportspeople from Lubusz Voivodeship